Bantry General Hospital is a public hospital located in Bantry, County Cork, Ireland. It is managed by South/Southwest Hospital Group.

History
The hospital has its origins in the Bantry Union Workhouse and Infirmary which was designed by George Wilkinson and opened in 1845. Bantry General Hospital was built on the site in 1959.

Services
The hospital provides 104 beds, of which 80 are in-patient acute beds, while 6 are reserved for acute day cases.  A further 18 beds are for psychiatric services.

References

External links
 

1959 establishments in Ireland
Bantry
Health Service Executive hospitals
Hospitals established in 1959
Hospitals in County Cork
Hospital buildings completed in 1959